Jan Marian Kaczmarek (February 2, 1920 – October 18, 2011) was a Polish mechanical engineer and university professor. He was appointed Minister of Science, Higher Education and Technology under Władysław Gomułka following the 1968 Polish political crisis.

Life 
Kaczmarek was born in Pabianice, Second Polish Republic. In 1938 he obtained a pilot license and in 1939, after the invasion of Poland by Nazi Germany and the Soviet Union, he took part in the September campaign as pilot of the Polish Air Force. He was wounded in battle and recuperated at a military hospital in Vilnius. Subsequently, he became member of the Lithuanian Resistance Movement, and in 1942 joined the Polish underground Armia Krajowa (Home Army) where he remained until 1945. After the end of the war Kaczmarek settled in Kraków and took up studies at the AGH University of Science and Technology. In 1948, he obtained the M.Sc. in mechanical engineering and began working for the local industry. For over a decade between 1957–68, he was the Managing Director of the Institute of Advanced Manufacturing Technologies in Kraków. He earned his Ph.D. in 1958 and D.Sc. in 1962. Kaczmarek was appointed Associate Professor in 1962 and Full Professor in 1969. Between 1965 and 1968, he served as Vice-Rector and in 1968 as Rector of  the Tadeusz Kościuszko University of Technology.

Kaczmarek relocated to Warsaw during the 1968 Polish political crisis and was appointed Minister of Science, Higher Education and Technology under Władysław Gomułka. In the next decade, he served as Secretary of the Polish Academy of Sciences. Kaczmarek was married to Olga; he has two children, four grandchildren, and four great-grandchildren.

Honours and awards
 Honoris causa:
 Chemnitz University of Technology, Germany (1973) 
 Bauman Moscow State Technical University, Russia (1974) 
 Poznan University of Technology, Poland (2001) 
 Koszalin University of Technology, Poland (2003) 
 Honorary Scholar - International Institute for Applied Systems Analysis, IIASA, Luxemburg (1993)

Awards 

 Officier, Golden order, Ordre des Palmes Académiques, France (1971)
 Grand Officer Legion of Honour, France (1972)
 Order of Marin Drinov, Bulgarian Academy of Sciences, Bulgary (1969)
 Order of Polonia Restituta, Poland
 Commander's Cross (1974)
 Knight's Cross (1962)
 Medal im. M. Kopernika, PAN, Poland (1977)
 Honorary citizenship
 Pabianice, Poland

References 

 Michal Czajka, Marcin Kamler, Witold Sienkiewicz, Leksykon historii Polski, WP, Warszawa 1995.

External links
 Ludzie nauki - Nauka Polska
 Professor Jan Kaczmarek – Twórca naukowej i dydaktycznej szkoly obróbki materialów
 Baza Ludzi nauki – Nauka Polska 
 Obituary information  from Polish Federation of engineering associations - NOT 

1920 births
2011 deaths
People from Pabianice
People from Łódź Voivodeship (1919–1939)
Members of the Central Committee of the Polish United Workers' Party
Government ministers of Poland
Members of the Polish Sejm 1972–1976
Members of the Polish Sejm 1985–1989
Members of the Polish Academy of Sciences
Recipients of the Order of the Builders of People's Poland
Commanders of the Order of Polonia Restituta
Officers of the Order of Polonia Restituta
Knights of the Order of Polonia Restituta
Recipients of the Gold Cross of Merit (Poland)
Recipients of the Silver Cross of Merit (Poland)
Recipients of the Bronze Cross of Merit (Poland)
Grand Officiers of the Légion d'honneur
Recipients of the Legion of Honour
Officiers of the Ordre des Palmes Académiques